The 2013–14 Mercer Bears men's basketball team represented Mercer University during the 2013–14 NCAA Division I men's basketball season. The Bears, led by sixth year head coach Bob Hoffman, played their home games at Hawkins Arena on the university's Macon, Georgia campus and were members of the Atlantic Sun Conference. They finished the season 27–9, 14–4 in A-Sun play to win the regular season A-Sun championship, shared with Florida Gulf Coast. They defeated Florida Gulf Coast in the championship game of the A-Sun tournament to be A-Sun Tournament champions and earn the conferences automatic bid to the NCAA tournament. In the NCAA Tournament, they upset Duke in the second round before losing in the third round to Tennessee.

This was their last season as a member of the Atlantic Sun as they joined the Southern Conference in July 2014.

Roster

Schedule

 
|-
!colspan=9 style="background:#E87511; color:#000000;"| Regular season

|-
!colspan=9 style="background:#E87511; color:#000000;"| Atlantic Sun tournament

|-
!colspan=9 style="background:#E87511; color:#000000;"| NCAA tournament

References

Mercer Bears men's basketball seasons
Mercer
Mercer
Mercer Bears
Mercer Bears